Voutsaras may refer to the following villages in Greece:

Voutsaras, Arcadia, in the municipal unit Falaisia, Arcadia
Voutsaras, Ioannina, in the municipal unit Molossoi, Ioannina regional unit